The Springfield Baptist Church, formerly Trinity Methodist Church, is a historic church in Beacon in Dutchess County, New York.  It was originally constructed about 1849 as the Associate Presbyterian Church.  It was expanded and improved in 1864, 1887, 1891, and 1895. The church consists of a large nave with a steeply pitched gable roof.  The main facade features an offset multi-stage bell tower with spire.

It was added to the National Register of Historic Places in 2010.

References

Methodist churches in New York (state)
Baptist churches in New York (state)
Churches on the National Register of Historic Places in New York (state)
Churches in Dutchess County, New York
National Register of Historic Places in Dutchess County, New York